Robert Milton Johnson (26 January 1879 – 25 July 1943) was a Progressive party member of the House of Commons of Canada. He was born in Collingwood Township, Ontario and became a farmer.

He was elected to Parliament at the Moose Jaw riding in the 1921 general election. During his term in Parliament, his election was annulled on 22 February 1923 and Johnson left the House of Commons. He made an unsuccessful attempt to win the Willow Bunch seat in the 1925 election. In the 1926 election, he returned to the Moose Jaw riding for another campaign but was also defeated. In the 1935 federal election, Johnson became the Social Credit party candidate for Moose Jaw, but drew the fewest votes of the riding.

References

External links 
 

1879 births
1943 deaths
Farmers from Saskatchewan
Members of the House of Commons of Canada from Saskatchewan
Progressive Party of Canada MPs
Social Credit Party of Canada candidates for the Canadian House of Commons
People from The Blue Mountains, Ontario